Bejak or Bajk may refer to:
 Bajk, Hormozgan
 Bejak, Khuzestan
 Bejak-e Bon, Khuzestan Province